The following articles contain list of teams on the World Curling Tour

List of teams on the 2010–11 World Curling Tour, the list of teams participating in the 2010–11 curling season
List of teams on the 2011–12 World Curling Tour, the list of teams participating in the 2011–12 curling season
List of teams on the 2012–13 World Curling Tour, the list of teams participating in the 2012–13 curling season
List of teams on the 2013–14 World Curling Tour, the list of teams participating in the 2013–14 curling season
List of teams on the 2014–15 World Curling Tour, the list of teams participating in the 2014–15 curling season
List of teams on the 2015–16 World Curling Tour, the list of teams participating in the 2015–16 curling season
List of teams on the 2016–17 World Curling Tour, the list of teams participating in the 2016–17 curling season
List of teams on the 2017–18 World Curling Tour, the list of teams participating in the 2017–18 curling season
List of teams on the 2018–19 World Curling Tour, the list of teams participating in the 2018–19 curling season
List of teams on the 2019–20 World Curling Tour, the list of teams participating in the 2019–20 curling season
List of teams on the 2020–21 World Curling Tour, the list of teams participating in the 2020–21 curling season

teams
Curling-related lists